Sally M. Nangala Mulda (born 1957) is an Arrernte and Southern Luritja artist who lives and works in Alice Springs. She paints for Tangentyere Artists.

Life and painting 

Mulda was born in Titjikala, 130 km from Alice Springs, and went to school in Amoonguna. A childhood accident left Mulda with vision impairment and losing the use of her left arm. Mulda moved to Alice Springs as a young woman and lives at Abbott's Town Camp (see Alice Springs Town Camps).

Mulda began painting early but it wasn't until she started working with Tangentyere Artists in 2008 that she started painting in what has now become her distinct style; this was assisted by surgery to improve her eyesight.

Mulda is known for her figurative and naive painting style in which she depicts many scenes from around Alice Springs including trees, homes, shops and figures. Equally important to this style is Mulda's addition of cursive script which is unique to her and introduces the paintings subject; all of which are political. Mulda paints about everyday life for Aboriginal people in Alice Springs, especially those living in town camps, and shows their gritty reality. A particular focus of her work is interactions between Aboriginal people and police and especially in relation to alcohol. Following the Intervention in 2007, it is illegal to buy and consume alcohol if you live in an Aboriginal community or a town camp; despite this it is easier to purchase alcohol when living in a town camp than more remotely and this has led to significant overcrowding in town camps and an increased police presence.

Achievements 
Mulda's work appears in major institution collections and in private collections and she has been a part of many major exhibitions; she has also:

 Finalist in the National Aboriginal & Torres Strait Islander Art Award in 2012, 2018 and 2019. 
 Two solo exhibitions at Alice Springs' Raft Art Space, 2016 and 2020 .
 Featured in The National 2019: New Australian Art exhibition at the Art Gallery of New South Wales.
 Shortlisted for the 2019,2021,2022 Sir John Sulman Prize at the Art Gallery of New South Wales.
 Shortlisted for the 2021 Archibald Prize at the Art Gallery of New South Wales.
 Featured in Adelaide's TARNANTHI: Festival of Contemporary Aboriginal and Torres Strait Islander Art in 2019.
 Four solo exhibitions at Brisbane's Edwina Corlette Gallery; 2018, 2019, 2020, 2023

See also 

 Art of Australia

References 

1957 births
Artists from the Northern Territory
Australian Aboriginal artists
Living people